The 2013–14 season are the Esteghlal Khuzestan Football Club's first season in the Iran Pro League and the top division of Iranian football. They are also competing in the Hazfi Cup.

Squad

Transfers

Summer 

In:

 
 

Out:

Winter

In:

Out:

Competitions

Iran Pro League

Standings

Results summary

Results by round

Matches

Hazfi Cup

Squad statistics

Appearances and goals

|-
|colspan="14"|Players who left Esteghlal Khuzestan during the season:

|}

Goal scorers

References

External links
Iran Premier League Statistics
Persian League

2013-14
Iranian football clubs 2013–14 season